Joseph Walsh ( – 24 December 2008) was an English professional rugby league footballer who played in the 1960s and 1970s.

Background
Walsh was born in Widnes, Lancashire, England, and he died aged 64 in Lindsey Lodge Hospice in Scunthorpe, North Lincolnshire.

Playing career

International honours
Walsh won a cap, and scored a try, for Great Britain while at Leigh in 1971 against New Zealand at Wheldon Road, Castleford.

Challenge Cup Final appearances
Walsh played  in Leigh's 24–7 victory over Leeds in the 1971 Challenge Cup Final during the 1970–71 season at Wembley Stadium, London on Saturday 15 May 1971, in front of a crowd of 85,514.

County Cup Final appearances
Walsh played  in Leigh's 7–4 victory over St. Helens in the 1970 Lancashire County Cup Final during the 1970–71 season at Station Road, Swinton on Saturday 28 November 1970.

BBC2 Floodlit Trophy Final appearances
Walsh played  in Leigh's 5–8 defeat by Castleford in the 1967 BBC2 Floodlit Trophy Final during the 1967–68 season at Headingley Rugby Stadium, Leeds on Saturday 16 January 1968, played  in the 11–6 victory over Wigan in the 1969 BBC2 Floodlit Trophy Final during the 1969–70 season at Central Park, Wigan on Tuesday 16 December 1969, and played  in the 4–12 defeat by Castleford in the 1976 BBC2 Floodlit Trophy Final during the 1976–77 season at Hilton Park, Leigh on Tuesday 14 December 1976.

Notable tour matches
Walsh made his full (starting) début for Warrington, and played  in Warrington's 15–12 victory over Australia in the 1978 Kangaroo tour of Great Britain and France match at Wilderspool Stadium, Warrington on Wednesday 11 October 1978.

Club career
Walsh made début for Leigh, and scored a try in the 17–7 victory over Leeds at Hilton Park, Leigh, Lancashire, the first-ever player to score a try when the first professional matches were allowed to take place Sundays in 1967, and he made his début for Warrington on Sunday 8 October 1978, and he played his last match for Warrington Friday 13 April 1979.

References

External links
!Great Britain Statistics at englandrl.co.uk (statistics currently missing due to not having appeared for both Great Britain, and England)
Statistics at wolvesplayers.thisiswarrington.co.uk

1940s births
2008 deaths
English rugby league players
Great Britain national rugby league team players
Leigh Leopards players
Rugby league players from Widnes
Rugby league wingers
Warrington Wolves players